Graeme Johnston (born 20 May 1942) is a former Australian rules footballer who played for Essendon in the VFL during the 1960s.

A half forward flanker, Johnston first played with Essendon in the 1962 season and finished the year in a premiership side. He was a premiership player again in 1965 and by the time he retired in 1967 had amassed a total of 71 VFL games.

External links 
 

1942 births
Australian rules footballers from Victoria (Australia)
Essendon Football Club players
Essendon Football Club Premiership players
Preston Football Club (VFA) players
Living people
Two-time VFL/AFL Premiership players